Josh O'Connor (born in 1989/1990)  is a British actor. He portrayed a young Charles III (Prince Charles) in the Netflix drama The Crown (2019–2020), for which he won the Golden Globe Award for Best Actor – Television Series Drama and the Primetime Emmy Award for Outstanding Lead Actor in a Drama Series, and received nominations for two British Academy Television Awards.

O'Connor also played the roles of Johnny Saxby in Francis Lee's God's Own Country (2017), for which he won a British Independent Film Award for Best Actor, Lawrence Durrell in the ITV series The Durrells (2016–2019), and Marius Pontmercy in BBC One's miniseries of Victor Hugo's novel Les Misérables (2019).

Early life and education
O'Connor was born to John, a teacher, and Emily, a midwife. He grew up in Newbury until he was five, when his family moved to Cheltenham, Gloucestershire where he was brought up. The middle son in a family of three boys, his older brother is an artist and his younger brother Seb is an ecological economist and a PhD researcher.

O'Connor comes from an artistic family. His grandfather was British sculptor John Bunting, his grandmother is a ceramicist, and his maternal aunt is British writer and commentator Madeleine Bunting. His ancestry is Irish, English, Scottish and, through his matrilineal great-grandmother, Ashkenazi and Sephardi Jewish.

He wanted to be a professional artist when he was younger, but he did not think he was good enough, so he switched to rugby and then discovered acting. His first major role was at age seven as the scarecrow in a school production of The Wizard of Oz, followed by a minor role in Bugsy Malone. O'Connor went to a private co-ed school, St Edward's School, Cheltenham, during the week and spent a lot of time on weekends at the Axiom, a local arts centre. He grew up in a Labour-supporting household, but traces his political awakening to the arts centre's closure when he was 11, feeling the deep sense of loss in the community. He is proud to have grown up outside of London, in a town with a strong tradition of regional theatre.

O’Connor has cited his school's drama program as having helped him live with his dyslexia for many years, especially when preparing for his General Certificate of Secondary Education exams (GCSEs). He then trained at the Bristol Old Vic Theatre School, from which he graduated in 2011 then moved to London. During his third year of theatre school, he signed with an agent.

Career

Early work and breakthrough
In 2012, O'Connor first appeared on television as Charlie Stephenson in Lewis and on film as a zombie in The Eschatrilogy: Book of the Dead. In 2013, he appeared in Doctor Who as Piotr, in The Magnificent Eleven as Andy, in Law & Order: UK as Rob Fellows, in The Wiper Times as Dodd, and in London Irish as James.

On stage in 2013, he was cast as Ben Fowles in his first professional play, Farragut North by Beau Willimon at the Southwark Playhouse. The Independent remarked, "O’Connor delivers a comic gem of a performance." This led to a role as young returning soldier Hugh in Peter Gill's 2014 play Versailles at the Donmar Warehouse in Covent Garden, London.

In the same year, he played Max in Hide and Seek, James in Peaky Blinders, and PC Bobby Grace in Ripper Street. After a year and a half of auditioning, he landed the role of a Bullingdon toff named Ed in The Riot Club (2014), Lone Scherfig's adaptation of Laura Wade's play Posh, appearing alongside up-and-coming British actors Sam Claflin, Douglas Booth, Max Irons, Freddie Fox, Ben Schnetzer, and Olly Alexander.

In 2015, he played Leo Beresford in Father Brown, a ballroom palace guard in Cinderella, and Charlie in the short film Holding on for a Good Time. He starred opposite his then-girlfriend Hannah Murray in Bridgend, Jeppe Rønde's dark, fictional portrayal of a real town in Wales with an alarmingly high teen suicide rate. O'Connor played Rich in the biographical drama film The Program about the cyclist Lance Armstrong, directed by Stephen Frears.

He also played in the Royal Shakespeare Company's production of Thomas Dekker's The Shoemaker's Holiday as Rowland Lacy and Tom Morton-Smith's Oppenheimer as Luis Alvarez at the Swan Theatre in Stratford-Upon-Avon. The following year, he took over the role of Donaghy in Florence Foster Jenkins, starring Meryl Streep and Hugh Grant, and starred as Donald in the short film Best Man. From 2016 to 2019, he played the role of Lawrence "Larry" Durrell in the ITV comedy-drama The Durrells.

In 2017, he starred as the young sheep farmer Johnny Saxby in the British drama film God's Own Country directed by Francis Lee. In preparation for his role, he worked with a Yorkshire farmer, laboring in the fields in between takes to learn the proper techniques and get the right physicality, and eventually birthed over 150 lambs. The film premiered at the Sundance Film Festival to critical acclaim. For his performance, he received multiple recognition including the British Independent Film Award for Best Actor and the Empire Award for Best Male Newcomer, and was nominated for the BAFTA Rising Star Award.

In 2018, O'Connor starred as Peter in the segment The Colour of His Hair in Boys on film 18: Heroes, and starred alongside Laia Costa in Harry Wootliff's critically acclaimed directorial debut Only You, which premiered in competition at the London Film Festival. For his performance, he received his second British Independent Film Award for Best Actor. In 2019, he portrayed Marius Pontmercy in the British television adaptation of Victor Hugo's Les Miserables. He also starred as Jamie in Hope Gap, which premiered at the Toronto International Film Festival, earning the Best Actor award at the Barcelona-Sant Jordi International Film Festival. It had a limited release in theaters before dropping digitally in May 2020.

Critical acclaim with The Crown
In the same year, O'Connor began portraying Charles, Prince of Wales in Season 3 of the award-winning Netflix programme The Crown (2019), starring alongside Olivia Colman, Tobias Menzies, and Helena Bonham Carter. In 2020, he was nominated for a British Academy Television Award for Best Supporting Actor for his role while the cast won the Screen Actors Guild Award for Outstanding Performance by an Ensemble in a Drama Series. He revealed that the role did not initially interest him and that he had to be persuaded to audition. Creator Peter Morgan asked him to read a scene in which Charles compares himself to a character in Saul Bellow's 1944 novel Dangling Man, in which the character waits to be drafted into war because the war will give his life meaning. It was the "aimlessness and purposelessness of Charles’s life as heir to the throne" that ultimately sparked O'Connor's interest in the character.

He reprised the role for Season 4 of The Crown (2020), and admitted that his character is "horrible" in that season. Still, he understands the source of Charles' discontent, saying that it all boils down to the fact that Charles has spent his entire life being overlooked. O'Connor won accolades in 2021 including the Primetime Emmy Award for Outstanding Lead Actor in a Drama Series, the Golden Globe Award, the Critics' Choice Award, and the Hollywood Critics Association TV Awards for Best Television Actor in a Drama Series and received a nomination for the British Academy Television Award for Best Actor for his performance. The cast also won its second Screen Actors Guild Award for Outstanding Performance by an Ensemble in a Drama Series. He described the culmination of his journey as Prince Charles as "the experience of a lifetime." Originally the fourth season was to conclude with Camillagate, however O'Connor refused to shoot that scene. 

O'Connor also played Mr. Elton in the period comedy-drama film Emma based on Jane Austen's 1815 novel of the same name. In 2021, he portrayed Romeo in the Royal National Theatre's television film adaptation of Shakespeare's Romeo and Juliet. He also played Paul Sheringham in Mothering Sunday,  which explores class divides and postwar survivor’s guilt in 1924, starring alongside Olivia Colman and Colin Firth. In the same year, it was announced that he would be working with Francis Lee again on a horror film with themes of "class and queerness". In October 2021, he was set to star in The History of Sound a World War I love story film to be directed by Oliver Hermanus and in drama film Lee set in World War II, directed by Ellen Kuras.

Artistry 
Francis Lee, director of God's Own Country, has described O'Connor as "one of those rare actors that is a real shape-shifter." His performance in the movie "confirmed his place on casting agents' scouting radar as one of those subtle, humble chameleons who can disappear into parts and are dubbed 'actor's actors'."

O'Connor experimented with method acting for his role in God's Own Country. He described his experience for Interview magazine:I had my own book of senses—paintings and drawings that I’d done and ideas I had. From there, I worked physically with Francis about how this guy would look. By the end of the film I was so skinny; I was gaunt. It was horrific. I was in character the whole way through. It was really lonely and hard. I don’t think I’d do it again. You isolate yourself from all your friends.The Crown creator Peter Morgan has compared O'Connor to former Barcelona midfielder Andrés Iniesta, a footballer with massive but unobtrusive skill. “I was drawn to his sensitivity and the fact that he was complex but likable,” Morgan said on casting O'Connor as Prince Charles. Olivia Colman praised him for the tenderness he displayed on-screen as well as his ability to inhabit the role: "Fragility, sparkle, strength, doubt: It’s all there in a second. Every scene we had together became my favorite scene."

Charity work and advocacies
O'Connor created the Waterlogged initiative to raise funds for Mind, a mental health charity working across England and Wales. Inspired by his mother who swam 60 times in her 60th year and by Roger Deakin's Waterlog, he attempted 30 swims around the UK and Ireland in his 30th year. In January 2020, he and Olivia Colman visited the Stars Appeal, which aims to enhance the patient experience at the Salisbury District Hospital. In December 2020, he and Emma Corrin offered their company for tea as part of a series of prize draws in support for War Child UK's Torn From Home appeal. In March 2021, he starred in Loewe's campaign shot in the Baja California Desert for the Eye/Loewe/Nature collection made with sustainable thinking and recycling ethos. It pledged 15 euros of every sale to Fundación Global Nature, a charity for the protection of wildlife species in danger of extinction.

Personal life
Prior to his recent relocation in New York, O'Connor lived in a Victorian house in Shoreditch. In his spare time, he enjoys reading and drawing. He also likes to go camping and swimming. He is a Southampton FC supporter. His girlfriend Margot Hauer-King, sister of actor Jonah Hauer-King, is a former partnerships director at communications company, WPP, and currently works as an account director at a digital start-up.

Turning 30 during the lockdown period in 2020 brought him to a realisation: "I don't actually like clubbing, or hanging out in groups, or pretending to be cool. Overnight I decided I don't have to like it. If I'm 30, I can admit that I like one-to-one dynamics, staying in, and reading."

Political views
O'Connor is a supporter of the Labour Party, campaigned for Jeremy Corbyn in the 2019 general election, and has described himself as a "liberal left-winger". He said of his views on the monarchy: "I'm a republican, although not in any kind of fist-waving, campaigning way. I was always mostly uninterested in them." In an interview with The New York Times he said, "I think the queen is an extraordinary woman. Time after time, lots of men have failed, and this one woman in power has been consistent and remained dutiful and generally apolitical. In that sense, I have huge respect for her — and for Charles [who] is another level of someone who's literally been waiting his entire life for this moment that still hasn't come."

Filmography

Films

Television

Theatre

Awards and nominations

See also
 List of British actors

References

External links

 
 
 
 

Living people
Alumni of Bristol Old Vic Theatre School
Audiobook narrators
British male film actors
British male television actors
British male voice actors
English people of Irish descent
English people of Scottish descent
English people of Jewish descent
Labour Party (UK) people
Male actors from Southampton
Actors from Gloucestershire
People from Cheltenham
21st-century British male actors
Best Drama Actor Golden Globe (television) winners
Screen Actors Guild Award winners
British male stage actors
British male models
British republicans
Outstanding Performance by a Lead Actor in a Drama Series Primetime Emmy Award winners
Year of birth missing (living people)
People of Sephardic-Jewish descent